Amman Jalmaani (December 15, 1948 – November 23, 2021) was a Filipino swimmer who competed in the Summer Olympics and the Asian Games.

Career
Jalmaani competed at the 1964, 1968 and the 1972 Summer Olympics.  He also participated at the 1966 Asian Games where he won two bronze medals, and the 1970 Asian Games, winning three silver medals. His last major competition was the 1974 Asian Games in Tehran where he clinched a bronze medal.

Later life and death
After his retirement, Jalmaani resided in Zamboanga City and served in the Armed Forces of the Philippines. He died in Zamboanga City on November 23, 2021.

References

External links
 

1948 births
2021 deaths
Filipino male swimmers
Olympic swimmers of the Philippines
Swimmers at the 1964 Summer Olympics
Swimmers at the 1968 Summer Olympics
Swimmers at the 1972 Summer Olympics
People from Sulu
Asian Games medalists in swimming
Asian Games silver medalists for the Philippines
Asian Games bronze medalists for the Philippines
Swimmers at the 1966 Asian Games
Swimmers at the 1970 Asian Games
Swimmers at the 1974 Asian Games
Medalists at the 1966 Asian Games
Medalists at the 1970 Asian Games
Medalists at the 1974 Asian Games
21st-century Filipino people
20th-century Filipino people